Karl-Heinz Geils (born 20 May 1955) is a German former footballer who played as a defender or midfielder.

He played 405 games in the Bundesliga for SV Werder Bremen, DSC Arminia Bielefeld, 1. FC Köln and Hannoverscher SV 96.

Honours 
1. FC Köln
 UEFA Cup finalist: 1985–86

References

External links 
 

Living people
1955 births
Association football midfielders
German footballers
SV Werder Bremen players
Arminia Bielefeld players
1. FC Köln players
Hannover 96 players
Bundesliga players
2. Bundesliga players
People from Osterholz
West German footballers
Footballers from Lower Saxony